In algebra, Solomon's descent algebra of a Coxeter group is a subalgebra of the integral group ring of the Coxeter group, introduced by .

The descent algebra of the symmetric group

In the special case of the symmetric group Sn, the descent algebra is given by the elements of the group ring such that permutations with the same descent set have the same coefficients. (The descent set of a permutation σ consists of the indices i such that σ(i) > σ(i+1).)  The descent algebra of the symmetric group Sn has dimension 2n-1. It contains the peak algebra as a left ideal.

References

Reflection groups